Delhi Wizards (DW) is a hockey team based in Delhi that plays in the World Series Hockey. Its captain is the Pakistani stryker Shakeel Abbasi. The team is owned by Wizcraft International and coached by former coach of Dutch hockey team Roelant Oltmans and Darryl D'Souza. Dhyan Chand National Stadium, Delhi is the home ground of Delhi Wizards.

Ownership
Wizcraft International acquired the Delhi franchise of the World Series Hockey (WSH). Wizcraft has been instrumental in shaping the event management and brand activation industry in India.

Team Composition
The team is captained by ace Pakistani striker Shakeel Abbasi with Dutchman Roelant Oltmans as the coach assisted by Indian Darryl D'Souza.

Fixtures and Results

2012

Statistics

References

See also
 World Series Hockey

World Series Hockey teams
Sports clubs in Delhi
2011 establishments in Delhi
Field hockey clubs established in 2011